The MasterCraft Boat Company is an American manufacturer of luxury high-performance boats. The company was founded in 1968 in Maryville, Tennessee, and is currently headquartered in Vonore, Tennessee. MasterCraft boats are used in waterskiing, wakeboarding and wakesurfing, though the company has also produced several boats that are not focused on water sports, such as the NauticStar line of fishing boats.

History

MasterCraft's founder Rob Shirley was a young waterskiing instructor who opened a waterskiing school in Florida 1965.  In 1968, with the help of a few fellow waterskiers, he modified a Ski Nautique boat manufactured by Correct Craft. The boat was completed in August, and debuted at the U.S. Nationals in Canton, Ohio. In that same year Rob had to close the school and moved to his wife's parent's farm in Maryville, Tennessee. There he founded the MasterCraft Boat Company, which initially operated out of a two-horse barn.

During its first year of operation, MasterCraft only built 12 boats using the modified hull design. The operating facility was moved to Vonore, Tennessee and now has approximately 600 employees. As of 2006, MasterCraft produced over 3,000 boats per year, sold in 25 different countries by over 100 domestic and international dealers.

Some of its most popular boats today are the ProStar, a direct drive ski boat, and the X Series Wakeboard boats. All MasterCraft models since 2012 use Ilmor Marine engines inboard marine engines built on the General Motors 5.3L GDI, 6.0L MPI, 6.2L GDI, and 7.4L MPI V8 engine blocks.

In 2007, the company was acquired by two private equity firms: Charlesbank Capital Partners and Transportation Resource Partners (affiliated with Roger Penske). In 2010, the company was recapitalized by Wayzata Investment Partners.

In May 2015, MasterCraft filed for an IPO to raise $100M.

On July 17, 2015, Nasdaq announced that trading of MCBC Holdings Inc., operator of MasterCraft Boat Company, commenced on The Nasdaq Stock Market trading as (Nasdaq:MCFT).

Brands

MasterCraft Boat Company
MasterCraft Boat Company is the flagship subsidiary of MasterCraft holdings. MasterCraft focuses on building premier towboats for water skiing, wakeboarding, and wake surfing.

NauticStar Boats
NauticStar is a Mississippi based manufacturer building a variety of fishing boats and deck boats. 
The Iconic Marine Group (IMG) announced on September 8, 2022 the acquisition of NauticStar Boats in Amory, Mississippi.

Crest
Crest builds pontoon boats which compete at the upper end of the market out of their Owosso, Michigan plant.

Aviara
Aviara specializes in building premium luxury day boats with a modern design. Aviara's manufacturing facility is in Merritt Island, Florida.

Series

ProStar Series

The ProStar series is the iconic line of MasterCraft's water ski tow boats known for their small wakes and performance. The ProStar series featured tournament ski boats, family ski boats, and price point ski boats over the years, Although most of the ProStar models used a direct drive propulsion system, there were a few V-Drive ProStar models produced. While the lineage of the ProStar series dates back to the original competition ski boats built by MasterCraft beginning in 1968, the first boat to bear the ProStar name was the ProStar 190 introduced for the 1987 model year. With the rising popularity of wake surfing, MasterCraft begun producing only their flagship competition ski boat under the ProStar name beginning in 2014.

X Series
The genesis of the X Series began in 1997 with the introduction of the X-Star. These boats are Mastercraft’s top of the line luxury boats with a focus on wakeboarding and wake surfing. 

The current model line up is: X-Star, X-Star S, X26, X24 and X22.

XT Series
Introduced in 2017. This model line is the “crossover” focused designs. They can create world class wakeboard and surf wakes, while also being able to produce an “open water” slalom ski wake.

The current XT Series consists of five models: XT20, XT22, XT22T, XT23, and XT24. The XT22T and XT23 are traditional bow boats, whereas the rest of the XT line are pickle fork designs.

NXT Series
The NXT Series was introduced in 2015 with the NXT 20 to bring more affordable offerings to the market without sacrificing build quality and construction. In 2016 
MasterCraft launched the NXT 22 to add to its line of entry level towboats. For 2020, MasterCraft redesigned both the NXT 20 and 22 using design cues from the X Series and XT Series. The second generation NXTs has a redesigned dash, factory profiles, and better ergonomics in the interior.

MasterCraft expanded the NXT series once again in 2021 with the introduction of the NXT 24.

The current NXT series consists of three models: NXT20, NXT22, and NXT24

CSX Series
The CSX (Cross Sport Xtreme) Series was designed to offer versatile boats suited for a variety of activities. These boats utilized a direct drive propulsion system with a center mounted engine and offered features designed for skiing, wakeboarding, fishing, diving, and other on water activities.

The CSX Series was discontinued after the 2011 model year.

MariStar Series
The MariStar Series was created in 1989 to compete in the luxury runabout segment.

TriStar Series

Notable Innovations

Swim Platform
1976 - MasterCraft introduced the first swim platform on a ski boat.

PowerSlot
1980 - MasterCraft introduced the optional PowerSlot 1.5:1 gear reduction transmission for increased acceleration.

Stringers
1983

WearGuard Pylon
1989 - MasterCraft introduced their patented WearGuard pylon which featured a plastic insert at the tow point in order to reduce rope wear.

EFI
1992 - MasterCraft brought the first fuel injected ski boat to the market with the Corvette LT1 engine marinated by Indmar.

Taglines
In Pursuit of Perfection (1987)

Inboards Beyond Imagination (1988)

Nothing Else Even Comes Close (1989-1993)

The Leader. And Pulling Farther Ahead. (1993-2003)

Held to a Higher Standard (2004-2010)

Team MasterCraft

Ski
 Ali Garcia
 Taylor Garcia
 Freddy Krueger
 Stephen Neveu
 Karen Truelove
 Freddie Winter

Wake
 Parks Bonifay
 Harley Clifford
 Meagan Ethell
 Tyler Higham
 Steel Lafferty

Surf
 Ashley Kidd
 Austin Keen
 Jett Lambert

References

External links 

 

Manufacturing companies based in Tennessee
American boat builders
Private equity portfolio companies
1968 establishments in Tennessee
Water sports equipment manufacturers
Sporting goods manufacturers of the United States
Manufacturing companies established in 1968
American companies established in 1968